The Canal du Rhône à Sète (lit. "canal from the Rhône to Sète") is a canal in southern France, which connects the Étang de Thau in Sète to the Rhône River in Beaucaire, Gard. The canal is made up of two previously constructed canals, the Canal des Étangs and Canal de Beaucaire. It connects with the Canal du Midi through the Étang de Thau.

There is, however, no access to the Rhône at Beaucaire as the lock has been closed since the Vallebregues barrage was built. The possibility of re-establishing the link "is being studied, but there is no prospect for the immediate future". Access to the Rhône is instead via the lock situated to the west of Saint-Gilles which links the canal to the Petit Rhône and from there northeastwards to the junction with the Grand Rhône at Fourques situated to the north of Arles.

Apart from the lock at Saint-Gilles there is only one other operating lock on the canal between St Gilles and Beaucaire. The canal is almost totally situated at sea level and the western part from the Vidourle river to the Étang de Thau is a sea-water canal.

In recent years major work has been undertaken to upgrade the canal so it can now be used by 1200t convoys instead of the previous 350t barges. Most notable are a stretch of canal bypassing the town of Aigues-Mortes with its railway swing bridge and a direct canal link to the port of Sète eliminating the passage of lifting and swing bridges in Frontignan and Sète.

En Route
 PK 0 Beaucaire
 PK 13.5 Bellegarde
 PK 24.5 Saint-Gilles
 PK 29 Junction with Canal de Saint-Gilles and Petit-Rhône (canal a dead end from here to Beaucaire) 
 PK 51 Aigues-Mortes, junction with Canal maritime to Le Grau-du-Roi 
 PK 61.5 Grande Motte
 PK 70.5 Pérols
 PK 75.5 Palavas-les-Flots, junction with river Lez, access to Port Ariane for Montpellier and to the Mediterranean Sea 
 PK 79 Villeneuve-lès-Maguelone
 PK 82 Vic-la-Gardiole
 PK 92-93 Frontignan, junction with high-capacity branch canal to the port of Sète 
 PK 98-100 Sète

See also
List of canals in France

References

External sources
Canal du Rhône à Sète and Étang de Thau, with maps and details of places, ports and moorings by the author of Inland Waterways of France, Imray
Navigation details for 80 French rivers and canals (French waterways website section)

Rhone a Sete
Buildings and structures in Gard
Buildings and structures in Hérault
Transport in Occitania (administrative region)